Kyle DeVan (born February 10, 1985) is an American football coach and former player. He was a coach for the New Orleans Saints and a guard. He was signed by the Washington Redskins as an undrafted free agent in 2008. He played college football at Oregon State.

DeVan has also been a member of the New York Jets, Indianapolis Colts, Philadelphia Eagles, and Boise Burn of AF2. DeVan has worked as a substitute teacher.

In the 2009 NFL season, DeVan was signed by the Indianapolis Colts, and later became the team's starting right guard. He started in the 2009 Super Bowl, in which the Colts lost to the New Orleans Saints.

Coaching career

Saints
He previously worked as an Assistant offensive line coach for the New Orleans Saints, and also served as the Assistant Head Coach and Offensive line coach for Ball State University.

Ball State
From 2016 to 2018, Devan was the offensive line coach for Ball State.

Arizona
On February 2, 2019, the Arizona Wildcats hired DeVan as the Offensive line coach. He was let go after the 2020 season.

Michigan
In 2021 DeVan served as an analyst for the Wolverines.

Colorado
In 2022 DeVan became the offensive line coach for the Buffalos.

Charlotte
On December 21, 2022 DeVan was named associate head coach, run game coordinator and offensive line coach on Biff Poggi's first coaching staff at Charlotte.

References

External links

Tennessee Titans bio
Philadelphia Eagles bio

1985 births
Living people
People from Vacaville, California
American football centers
American football offensive guards
Oregon State Beavers football players
Washington Redskins players
New York Jets players
Boise Burn players
Indianapolis Colts players
Philadelphia Eagles players
Tennessee Titans players
Players of American football from California
Sportspeople from the San Francisco Bay Area
New Orleans Saints coaches
Ball State Cardinals football coaches
Arizona Wildcats football coaches
Michigan Wolverines football coaches
Colorado Buffaloes football coaches